Greatest Hits 2 is a compilation album by Bob Seger, released in 2003.

Track listing

Some later issues of the CD did not feature the two previously unreleased bonus tracks, nor the "Turn the Page" bonus music video.

Personnel
As listed in the liner notes.

Chris Campbell – bass guitar 
Pete Carr – electric guitar 
Craig Frost – organ 
Russ Kunkel – drums 
Bill Payne – piano 
Bob Seger – lead vocals, acoustic guitar 
Julia Waters, Luther Waters, Maxine Waters, Oren Waters – background vocals 

Drew Abbott – guitar 
Chris Campbell – bass guitar 
Charlie Allen Martin – drums 
Robyn Robbins – piano 
Bob Seger – lead vocals 

 
Drew Abbott – guitar 
Chris Campbell – bass guitar 
Bob Seger – lead vocals, lead guitar 
David Teegarden – drums, percussion 

Barry Beckett – grand piano, organ, synthesizer, electric piano  
Pete Carr – lead guitar, acoustic guitar 
Roger Hawkins – drums, percussion 
David Hood – bass guitar 
Jimmy Johnson – rhythm guitar 
Spooner Oldham – organ, electric piano
Bob Seger – lead vocals 

Barry Beckett – piano 
Pete Carr – lead guitar, rhythm guitar 
Roger Hawkins – drums, percussion 
David Hood – bass guitar 
Jimmy Johnson – rhythm guitar 
Bob Seger – lead vocals 

Drew Abbott – guitar 
Barry Beckett – grand piano, organ, synthesizer, electric piano
Kenny Bell – guitar 
Harrison Calloway – trumpet 
Pete Carr – lead guitar, acoustic guitar 
Ronald Eades – baritone saxophone 
Roger Hawkins – drums, percussion 
David Hood – bass guitar 
Jimmy Johnson – rhythm guitar 
Spooner Oldham – organ, electric piano
Charles Rose – trombone 
Bob Seger – lead vocals, slide guitar, harmonica 
Stoney & Rocky – background vocals 
Harvey Thompson – tenor saxophone 

Drew Abbott – guitar 
Chris Campbell – bass guitar 
Laura Creamer – background vocals 
Glenn Frey – harmony vocals 
Craig Frost – organ 
Bobbye Hall – percussion 
Russ Kunkel – drums 
Shaun Murphy – background vocals 
Bill Payne – piano 
Bob Seger – lead vocals, harmony vocals 
Joan Sliwin – background vocals 
Waddy Wachtel – guitar 

Barry Beckett – piano 
Pete Carr – lead guitar, acoustic guitar 
Glenn Frey – harmony vocals 
Roger Hawkins – drums, percussion 
Don Henley – harmony vocals 
David Hood – bass guitar 
Jimmy Johnson – rhythm guitar 
Randy McCormick – organ 
Timothy B. Schmit – harmony vocals 
Bob Seger – lead vocals 

Drew Abbott – electric guitar 
Chris Campbell – bass guitar, background vocals 
Craig Frost – piano, organ 
Pam Moore – background vocals 
Shaun Murphy – percussion, background vocals 
Alto Reed – alto saxophone, tenor saxophone 
Bob Seger – lead vocals, electric guitar 
David Teegarden – drums, background vocals 
June Tilton – background vocals 

 
Harold Faltermeyer – Synclavier 
Keith Forsey – percussion 
Dann Huff – guitar 
Bob Seger – lead vocals

 
Roy Bittan – piano 
Bob Glaub – bass guitar
Bob Seger – lead vocals 
Harry Stinson – drums 
Michael Thompson – guitar 
Jeffrey CJ Vanston – keyboards

Richie Hayward – drums 
Buell Neidlinger – stand-up bass 
Dean Parks – electric guitar 
Bill Payne – piano 
Bob Seger – lead vocals 
Fred Tackett – acoustic guitar 

Eddie Bayers – drums 
Larry Byrom – guitar 
David Campbell – string arrangements 
Martina McBride – vocals 
Matt Rollings – piano 
Bob Seger – vocals 
Glenn Worf – bass guitar 

Drew Abbott – guitar 
Chris Campbell – bass guitar 
Charlie Allen Martin – drums 
Alto Reed – saxophone 
Robyn Robbins – piano, organ 
Bob Seger – lead vocals 

 
J. T. Corenflos – acoustic guitar 
Paul Leim – drums 
Steve Nathan – piano, organ 
Brent Rowan – electric guitar, acoustic guitar
Bob Seger – lead vocals
Glenn Worf – bass guitar 

J. T.  Corenflos – electric guitar 
Eric Darken – percussion 
Richie Hayward – drums 
Shaun Murphy – background vocals 
Bob Seger – lead vocals, electric guitar 
Glenn Worf – bass guitar

References

2003 greatest hits albums
Bob Seger compilation albums
Capitol Records compilation albums